Embrace is a non profit organization which provided low-cost incubators to prevent neonatal deaths in rural areas in developing countries. The organization was developed in 2008 during the multidisciplinary Entrepreneurial Design For Extreme Affordability course at Stanford University by group members Jane Chen, Linus Liang, Rahul Panicker, Razmig Hovaghimian, and Naganand Murty.

In 2015 Embrace became part of Thrive Networks (also called East Meets West) which is a non-governmental organization founded in 1988 by Le Ly Hayslip.

Incubator
The Embrace infant warmer is a low-cost solution that maintains premature and low-birth-weight babies’ body temperature, that would give premature infants a better chance at survival. A baby born two weeks premature lacks the ability to regulate its own body temperature and needs to be transferred to an incubator within an hour. The Embrace Warmer claims to increase that time to 4 hours.  
The Embrace development team won the fellowship at the Echoing Green competition in 2008 for this concept. Embrace also won the 2007-2008 Business Association of Stanford Entrepreneurial Students Social E-Challenge competition grand prize.  At a ceremony at BAFTA in London on December 3, 2013 Jane Chen, Linus Liang, Naganand Murty and Rahul Panicker won an innovation award from the Economist.

References

External links

ABC feature video on Embrace ABC's new Global Health Series 20/20 "Be the Change: Save a Life" - November issue

Appropriate technology
Social enterprises
Pediatric organizations
Non-profit organizations based in San Francisco